The Durazno Plantation is a historic Southern plantation near Jones Creek, Texas.

Location
It is located near Jones Creek in Brazoria County, Texas.

History
In 1840, 500 acres of land was taken from the Peach Point Plantation to create the Durazno Plantation. "Durazno" is Spanish for peach. The new plantation was given to William Joel Bryan (1815–1903) as dowry when he married Lavinia Perry in 1840. The people he enslaved enslaved were forced to grow cotton and raise cattle. After his death, it was inherited by his son Samuel Irwin Bryan, who bequeathed half to his daughter Louella Bryan Brutrus, half to his nephew, Samuel Irwin Stratton.

It has been listed on the National Register of Historic Places listings since September 2, 1980.

See also

National Register of Historic Places listings in Brazoria County, Texas

References

Houses in Brazoria County, Texas
Houses on the National Register of Historic Places in Texas
Historic districts on the National Register of Historic Places in Texas
National Register of Historic Places in Brazoria County, Texas
Cotton plantations in Texas
Ranches in Texas